Sugar Island is an  island located in Maine's Moosehead Lake. Sugar Island is Moosehead Lake's largest island. They are located in the unorganized territory of Northwest Piscataquis, Maine.

Sugar Island is mainly accessed through Lily Bay State Park, and takes about five minutes from the state park by boat. There is a fee at the state park of three dollars. 
There are two resident camps on Sugar Island on the south side which have been frequented by three generations of family members and friends year after year. In the year 2000 census, the families were not there however, so the population is officially 0.

References

Islands of Piscataquis County, Maine
Islands of Maine